is a Japanese surname. Notable people with the surname include:

Akira Yasuda (born 1964), Japanese illustrator and animator
Atsushi Yasuda (1868–1924), Japanese lichenologist
Aya Yasuda (born 1982), Japanese luger
Haruo Yasuda (born 1943), Japanese professional golfer
Hironobu Yasuda (born 1983), Japanese racing driver
Hiroshi Yasuda (born 1944), emeritus professor at the University of Tokyo and consultant for Nippon Telegraph and Telephone
Junpei Yasuda (born 1974), Japanese journalist
Kan Yasuda (born 1945), Japanese sculptor
Kei Yasuda (born 1980), Japanese musician
Ken Yasuda (born 1971), Japanese professional bodybuilder
Ken Yasuda (born 1973), Japanese actor
Kenneth Yasuda (1914–2002), Japanese-American scholar and translator
Kimiyoshi Yasuda (born 1911), Japanese film director
Kodai Yasuda (born 1989), Japanese football player
Koh Yasuda (1907–1943), Japanese ophthalmologist 
Mac Yasuda, vintage-guitar collector
Michihiro Yasuda (born 1987), Japanese football player
Michio Yasuda (born 1949), former Japanese football player
Michiyo Yasuda (1939–2016), Japanese animator
Miwa Yasuda (born 1977), Japanese voice actress
Yasuda Nagahide (1516–1582), retainer beneath the clan of Uesugi
Narumi Yasuda (born 1966), Japanese actress
Paul Hisao Yasuda (1921–2016), Japanese prelate of the Roman Catholic Church
Ryumon Yasuda (1891–1965), Japanese painter and sculptor
Satoru Yasuda (born 1975), Japanese pole vaulter
Shota Yasuda (born 1984), J-pop singer and actor
Sotaro Yasuda (born 1986), American born actor and model in Japan
Suzuhito Yasuda, Japanese manga artist and illustrator
Tadao Yasuda (born 1963), Japanese professional wrestler and former sumo wrestler
Takeo Yasuda (1889–1964), Japanese military officer
Takeshi Yasuda (born 1943), Japanese potter
Toko Yasuda, Japanese musician
Tomo Yasuda, Japanese-American musician
Yasuda Tsuyoshi (born 1980), manga artist
, Japanese volleyball player
Yoshihiro Yasuda (born 1948), Japanese lawyer
Yojūrō Yasuda (1910―1981), Japanese literary critic
Yasuda Yukihiko (Shinzaburō; 1884–1978), figure in Taisho and early Showa period Japanese painting
Yasuda Zenjirō (1838–1921), Japanese entrepreneur who founded the Yasuda zaibatsu

Japanese-language surnames